Liu Guangbin (born 3 November 1979) is a Chinese speed skater. He competed in the men's 1500 metres event at the 2002 Winter Olympics.

References

1979 births
Living people
Chinese male speed skaters
Olympic speed skaters of China
Speed skaters at the 2002 Winter Olympics
Place of birth missing (living people)
Asian Games medalists in speed skating
Speed skaters at the 1999 Asian Winter Games
Medalists at the 1999 Asian Winter Games
Asian Games silver medalists for China
20th-century Chinese people